Fannefjorden is a fjord located in Molde Municipality in Møre og Romsdal county, Norway. The fjord begins just east of the city of Molde on the north shore with the island of Bolsøya on the south side. It is believed that "Fannefjorden" is very old name, and perhaps a name originally applied to the whole area.

European Route E39 runs along the north side of the fjord from the city of Molde to the village of Hjelset on the northern shore of the fjord, where the road turns northward.  The village of Kleive is located near the end of the fjord. County Road 64 crosses under the fjord in the Fannefjord Tunnel.

See also
 List of Norwegian fjords

References

Fjords of Møre og Romsdal
Molde